Komany is a 1989 Moroccan film directed by Nabyl Lahlou.

Synopsis 
In a country called Lashistan, a dictator rules. A sect wants to overthrow him to seize power and establish a theocracy. Mozad, QBZ chief, proposes to the leaders of the sect to film the president in scenes where he kills, tortures and executes; and in others, where he is engaged in total debauchery. To do so, Mozad introduces the plotters to Komany, and alcoholic actor and a look-alike of the president.

Cast 

 Salim Berrada
 Sofia Hadi
 Hamidou
 Rachid Fekkak 
 Mohamed Miftah

References 

1989 films
Moroccan drama films
1980s Arabic-language films
Films directed by Nabyl Lahlou